This is a list of United Nations Security Council Resolutions 1001 to 1100 adopted between 30 June 1995 and 27 March 1997.

See also 
 Lists of United Nations Security Council resolutions
 List of United Nations Security Council Resolutions 901 to 1000
 List of United Nations Security Council Resolutions 1101 to 1200

1001